Myxedema psychosis is a relatively uncommon consequence of hypothyroidism, such as in Hashimoto's thyroiditis or in patients who have had the thyroid surgically removed and are not taking thyroxine. A chronically under-active thyroid can lead to slowly progressive dementia, delirium, and in extreme cases to hallucinations, coma, or psychosis, particularly in the elderly. 

"Myxedema" is a synonym with severe hypothyroidism. It was first described in 1888 by “the Committee of the Clinical Society of London appointed in 1883 to consider the subject of myxedema”, as "Delusions and hallucinations occur in nearly half the cases, mainly where the disease is advanced... acute or chronic manias, dementia, or melancholia, with a marked predominance of suspicion and self-accusation."

The name "myxedema madness" was proposed in 1949. It is diagnosed through the measurement of thyroid stimulating hormone and treated by application of L-thyroxine. With treatment, over 80% of patients achieve complete remission of psychosis.

Myxedematous psychosis, more commonly referred to as the myxedema madness is manifested through hypothyroidism which is a condition in where the thyroid gland does not produce enough thyroid hormones, some of the most common symptoms linked with both of these conditions include: Fatigue, Cold intolerance, Menstrual abnormalities, Decreased appetite, Constipation, Hoarse voice, Bradycardia, Non-pitting edema, Facial puffiness, Slow speech, and Delayed relaxation of deep tendon reflex and fatigue.

Examplecase report: a 42 year-old women who had suffered from papillary thyroid carcinoma and had a thyroidectomy which ultimately resulted in her developing paranoid delusions and visual/auditory hallucinations whilst undergoing treatment for elective radioactive iodine treatment, according to the report it states that “she had no history of mental illness” and that “the patient was immediately treated with thyroid hormone replacement therapy”

See also
 Hashimoto's encephalopathy

References

 

Symptoms and signs: Endocrinology, nutrition, and metabolism
Thyroid disease